Aboyne railway station was a station which served Aboyne in the Scottish county of Aberdeenshire. It was served by trains on the line from Aberdeen to Ballater.

History
A second company, the Deeside Extension Railway, was incorporated in 1857 to continue the line to Aboyne where it opened the station on 2 December 1859 as its terminus.

Later to be leased and then part of the Great North of Scotland Railway, the station became part of the London and North Eastern Railway during the Grouping of 1923, passing on to the Scottish Region of British Railways during the nationalisation of 1948. It was then closed by the British Railways Board on 28 February 1966.

The station was host to a LNER camping coach from 1937 to 1939.  A coach was also positioned here by Scottish Region of British Railways from 1954 to 1960.

Aboyne Curling Pond railway station, also known as Loch of Aboyne Platform or Curlers' Platform, was a nearby private station opened on the Deeside Extension Railway for the use of the curlers, who played on the nearby Loch of Aboyne.

The station closed for passengers on 28 February 1966 and for goods on 18 July 1966.

The site today
The line is now part of the Deeside Way footpath, while the station is home to a range of shops.

References

Notes

Sources

Further reading

External links
Film of the station and the Deeside line.
 RAILSCOT on Deeside Railway
 RAILSCOT on Deeside Extension Railway
 RAILSCOT on Aboyne and Braemar Railway 

Disused railway stations in Aberdeenshire
Railway stations in Great Britain opened in 1859
Railway stations in Great Britain closed in 1966
Beeching closures in Scotland
Former Great North of Scotland Railway stations
1859 establishments in Scotland
1966 disestablishments in Scotland